Helena Basilova (Russian: (Елена Басилова), born 1 February 1983) is a classical pianist born in Russia and based in the Netherlands. Educated in the Netherlands and New York City, Basilova has championed the works of Eastern European composers such as Alexander Scriabin and Leoš Janáček with recordings on Quintone Records.

Family 
Helena Basilova was born in the former Soviet Union as a daughter of two pianists. Her father Alexander Basilov (1946-2007), was a prominent Russian pianist, composer and piano teacher at Gnessin State Musical College. Basilov had studied at the Moscow Conservatory with Stanislav Neuhaus, son of Heinrich Neuhaus, one of Russia's most influential piano professors.

To stretch the importance of heritage and passing on of tradition, Helena Basilova conducts research on the life and work of her father since 2012. With the help of the Dutch publisher Donemus, newly found music by Alexander Basilov has become available in 2018. The Dutch newspaper De Volkskrant wrote an article on the research.

Career 
Performing often in The Netherlands and abroad, Basilova has played in a number of notable halls including Concertgebouw Amsterdam, Carnegie Hall’s Weill Hall, Symphony Space NYC, the HPAC Japan and the NCPA in Mumbai. The New York Times described Basilova's playing as 'sensitively and with flair'.

To widen the scope and reach of classical music, Helena composed programs combining piano music with poetry, theatre, philosophy and visual arts. Basilova is artistic director of the Concert Series ‘Mevrouw de Uil''' at Uilenburgersjoel in Amsterdam.

In addition to solo performance, Basilova is a Professor of Piano at the Artez Institute of the Arts.

 Awards  
Helena Basilova was prize winner of various competitions
 Echo Klassik (2017)
 American Protégé Competition (2011)
  (2008) (nowadays called Dutch Classical Talent Award)
 Het Debuut (2008)
  Piano Competition] (2004)

References 

Russian women pianists
Dutch women pianists
1983 births
Living people
Russian emigrants to the Netherlands
21st-century pianists
Women classical pianists
21st-century women pianists